Derek Mears (born April 29, 1972) is an American actor and stuntman. Often appearing in horror and science-fiction titles, he came to prominence for portraying Jason Voorhees in the 2009 reboot of Friday the 13th. His film roles also include The Hills Have Eyes 2 (2007), Predators (2010), Pirates of the Caribbean: On Stranger Tides (2011), Hansel & Gretel: Witch Hunters (2013), and Alita: Battle Angel (2019). On television, he played the title character on the DC Universe series Swamp Thing (2019).

Life and career
Mears was born in Bakersfield, California. He performed improv comedy at ComedySportz in Bakersfield. He graduated from Highland High School in Bakersfield in 1990. Early on in life Mears had a severe case of the auto-immune disease alopecia, causing him to lose almost all his body hair.

Mears has numerous credits both as a stuntman and as an actor. He had minor roles in The Tick, ER, Alias, Nash Bridges, Men in Black II, The Shield, CSI: NY, My Name Is Earl, Mr. & Mrs Smith, CSI: Miami, Community, and The Hills Have Eyes 2. His stunt credits include the films Pirates of the Caribbean: The Curse of the Black Pearl, Pirates of the Caribbean: Dead Man's Chest, Indiana Jones and the Kingdom of the Crystal Skull and Blades of Glory, and TV series such as Angel and Bones.

Mears got his breakthrough lead role in the 2009 Friday the 13th film. He was recommended to the producers, Brad Fuller and Andrew Form of Platinum Dunes, by make-up and special effects guru Scott Stoddard, who created the new look for Mears' character, Jason Voorhees. Due to Mears' height at  he is one of the tallest actors who have portrayed Jason, beside Ken Kirzinger, who stands at a similar height to Mears. He was nominated for an MTV Movie Award in the category for Best Villain for his portrayal of Voorhees, but lost to Heath Ledger as the Joker in The Dark Knight.

Mears did a lot of research on child development to flesh out the role of Camp Crystal Lake's notorious resident serial killer:

He is contracted to return for either another Friday the 13th sequel or another film by Platinum Dunes. If Mears reprises his role as Jason, he will be only the second person to portray the character more than once, next to Kane Hodder. He portrayed a Predator in the 2010 science fiction horror film sequel Predators.

Mears appeared in Ultraforce 2 on the Superego podcast. He also appeared in the American sitcom Community in the episode "Romantic Expressionism". He appeared as a zombie, credited as "Master-at-Arms", in Pirates of the Caribbean: On Stranger Tides.

Mears appeared with other horror actor Tyler Mane of Rob Zombie's Halloween in Compound Fracture.

On June 5, 2013, it was reported that Warner Bros. had relinquished their film rights to the Friday the 13th series to Paramount as part of a deal that allowed Warner Bros. to co-produce Interstellar. One week later, Mears revealed that Paramount was working with Platinum Dunes to make a new installment "as fast as possible".

In a series of adverts for the insurance company Direct Line shown in 2021, Mears portrayed the character RoboCop.

Filmography

References

External links

Interview with Derek Mears at SuicideGirls.com
FEARnet Interview with Derek Mears
 

1972 births
Living people
American male film actors
American stunt performers
American male television actors
Male actors from Bakersfield, California
20th-century American male actors
21st-century American male actors
People with alopecia universalis